Joseph Frederick Spaniol Jr. was the 18th Clerk of the Supreme Court of the United States, a position he held from 1985 to 1991.

Spaniol was a graduate of John Carroll University and the Case Western Reserve University School of Law.

His wife, Viola, died from cancer in 2002. At the time of her death, the couple had eight surviving children.

References

Living people
Clerks of the Supreme Court of the United States
John Carroll University alumni
Case Western Reserve University alumni
Georgetown University alumni
Year of birth missing (living people)